Baniyas Sports and Cultural Club is an Emirati sports club, based in Al Shamkha, in the Baniyas area of Abu Dhabi. The club competes in the UAE Pro League.

Presidency

 Source: Presidency

Honours
President's Cup 
Winners: 1991–92
Division One 
Winners: 1994–95, 2004–05, 2008–09, 2017–18
Gulf Cup
Winners: 2012–13

Current technical staff

Current squad
As of UAE Pro-League:

Unregistered players